West Salem Historic District is a national historic district located at Winston-Salem, Forsyth County, North Carolina.  The district encompasses 591 contributing buildings, 1 contributing site, and 3 contributing structures in a largely residential section of Winston-Salem.  The buildings date from about 1843 to 1957, and include notable examples of Colonial Revival, Queen Anne, and American Craftsman style architecture, as well as bungalows.  Notable resources include the M. D. Gantt Building (1931), Coca-Cola Bottling plant (1930), Christ Moravian Church (1895), and Green Street Methodist Church (1921).

It was listed on the National Register of Historic Places in 2005.

References

Historic districts on the National Register of Historic Places in North Carolina
Colonial Revival architecture in North Carolina
Queen Anne architecture in North Carolina
Buildings and structures in Winston-Salem, North Carolina
National Register of Historic Places in Winston-Salem, North Carolina